Sidi Lakhdar is an Algerian commune in the Aïn Defla Province, approximately 125 km west of the capital, Algiers. During the period of French colonization, it was called Lavarande. In 2023, it had a population of 28361.

Notable people

References

Communes of Aïn Defla Province
Cities in Algeria
Algeria